Badge of Infamy is a juvenile science fiction novel written by American writer Lester del Rey. It was published by Galaxy Science Fiction Novels in 1963.

Premise 
In the future, powerful unions called lobbies control much of society. One of the most powerful lobbies is the medical lobby, which following a pandemic that spread across earth, has required all medicine from being practiced only by authorized lobby members and only in approved lobby facilities. Daniel Feldman was once a doctor but has now become a pariah due to his breach of these rules. Trying to escape the shame he travels to Mars, where he discovers a disaster threatening billions of lives.

References

External links 
 Badge of Infamy on Project Gutenberg
 Badge of Infamy on Librivox

1963 American novels
American science fiction novels
American young adult novels
Children's science fiction novels
1963 science fiction novels
Novels set on Mars
Novels by Lester del Rey
Space exploration novels